Shiloh is a village in St. Clair County, Illinois, United States. The 2010 census recorded a population of 12,651. Shiloh is located within the St. Louis metropolitan area

History
A site known as "Three Springs" for its geological characteristics hosted an 11-day revival camp meeting in April 1807, which was the first in St. Clair County and possibly the second in Illinois Country, which was then part of Indiana Territory. It was organized by the Rev. William McKendree, Presiding Elder of the Western Conference and 4th Bishop of the Methodist Episcopal Church.

This assembly inspired construction of the log Shiloh Meeting House on the site shortly afterward, being the first Methodist church in the county and second in the Illinois Country. This meeting house came to be the longest-organized United Methodist church in the state of Illinois, bequeathing its name to the village and township which grew up around it.  Three members of this church played significant roles in state government in the effort to prevent slaveholding from gaining a foothold in Illinois.

Geography
Shiloh is located at  (38.5501, -89.9149).

Shiloh is the site of Scott Air Force Base and is also the present eastern terminus of the Saint Louis area electric interurban Metrolink Red Line.

Demographics

As of the census of 2000, there were 7,643 people, 2,778 households, and 2,080 families residing in the village. The racial makeup of the village was 82.14% White, 13.32% African American, 0.27% Native American, 1.79% Asian, 0.08% Pacific Islander, 0.75% from other races, and 1.65% from two or more races. Hispanic or Latino of any race were 2.62% of the population.

There were 2,778 households, out of which 40.9% had children under the age of 18 living with them, 60.8% were married couples living together, 10.7% had a female householder with no husband present, and 25.1% were non-families. 20.2% of all households were made up of individuals, and 5.1% had someone living alone who was 65 years of age or older. The average household size was 2.63 and the average family size was 3.05.

In the village, the population age distribution was 27.7% under 18, 10.7% from 18 to 24, 34.6% from 25 to 44, 20.4% from 45 to 64, and 6.7% that were 65 years of age or older. The median age was 33 years. For every 100 females, there were 102.0 males. For every 100 females age 18 and over, there were 98.0 males.

The median income for a household in the village was $57,692, and the median income for a family was $67,054. Males had a median income of $42,083 versus $30,843 for females. The per capita income for the village was $25,550. About 6.1% of families and 7.7% of the population were below the poverty line, including 11.1% of those under age 18 and 1.6% of those age 65 or over.

Education
The Shiloh Village School District 85 consists of two schools. Most children attend Shiloh Elementary and Shiloh Middle School, both public schools. Shiloh students attend O'Fallon Township High School, District 203. Students west of Greenmount Road attend Whiteside Elementary School and attend Belleville Township High School East.

Health care
Shiloh is home to Memorial Hospital East, part of BJC HealthCare. A satellite facility of the Alvin J. Siteman Cancer Center is also in Shiloh as it moved into Shiloh in early 2020.

Notable people

 Ken Bone, participant in the second 2016 Presidential debate
 Shannon O'Keefe, professional ten-pin bowler and bowling coach for McKendree University
 Mary Wickes, actress who is interred at the Shiloh Valley Cemetery

References

External links
 www.shilohil.org
 www.shiloh.stclair.k12.il.us/

Villages in St. Clair County, Illinois
Villages in Illinois
Populated places established in 1807